Mortification can refer to:
Mortification (theology), theological doctrine
Mortification of the flesh, religious practice of corporal mortification
Mortification of self, personality disruption experienced by individuals in a total institution or settings with similar characteristics
Mortification in Roman Catholic teaching, Roman Catholic doctrine of mortification
Mortification (band), a Christian extreme metal band
Extreme embarrassment
 Mortification (album)